Ricardo Galindo III is an American politician. He served as a Republican member for the 117th district of the Texas House of Representatives.

Born in San Antonio, Texas, the son of Valerie and Oscar Hernandez Galindo, Galindo attended St. Mary's University in Texas. In 2015, he was elected to represent the 117th district of the Texas House of Representatives, succeeding Philip Cortez. In 2017, he was succeeded by Cortez with Galindo claiming that there was "a flagrant abuse of the public trust" in one of Cortez's business methods.

References 

Living people
Year of birth missing (living people)
Politicians from San Antonio
Republican Party members of the Texas House of Representatives
21st-century American politicians
St. Mary's University, Texas alumni
Hispanic and Latino American state legislators in Texas
American politicians of Mexican descent